Gabriel "Gabi" Popescu (born 25 December 1973) is a Romanian former professional footballer who played as a midfielder.

Career
Popescu represented the Romania national team 21 times and scored four goals, he was also capped 37 times for the U-21 side. The undoubted highlight of his international career was his appearances at the 1998 FIFA World Cup, where he played in all four Romanian matches, including their dramatic 2–1 victory over England.

Popescu began his career with Romanian side Universitatea Craiova, before moving to Spain where he played with three different La Liga clubs – UD Salamanca, Valencia CF and CD Numancia. After his Spanish spell he returned to Romania firstly with Dinamo București before joining city rivals National București. Popescu then joined Suwon Samsung Bluewings in June 2002, in a double deal that also saw Bosnian-born forward Slaviša Mitrović join the K-League club.

'Gabi', as he was known to Korean fans, made a great impression in the Suwon Samsung Bluewings midfield during his first season, scoring six times in his 24 appearances. He weighed in with another six strikes in the 2003 season to further endear himself to the Suwon Samsung Bluewings fans, but struggled with injury during the close season and was limited to a peripheral role during the first half of 2004.

Popescu was allowed to return to National București on a 6-month loan deal in the summer of 2004, where he linked up again with Slaviša Mitrović. At the end of the year, Popescu completed a switch to Japanese side JEF United Chiba.

Career statistics

Club

International

Score and result list Romania's goal tally first, score column indicates score after Popescu goal.

Honours
Valencia
Copa del Rey: 1998–99
UEFA Intertoto Cup: 1998

Dinamo București
Divizia A: 1999–2000
Romanian Cup: 1999–2000

Suwon Samsung Bluewings
Korean FA Cup: 2002
Asian Super Cup: 2002

JEF United Chiba
J.League Cup: 2005

References

External links
 
 
 
 
 

1973 births
Living people
Sportspeople from Craiova
Romanian footballers
Association football midfielders
Romania international footballers
1998 FIFA World Cup players
FC U Craiova 1948 players
UD Salamanca players
Valencia CF players
CD Numancia players
FC Dinamo București players
FC Progresul București players
Suwon Samsung Bluewings players
JEF United Chiba players
Liga I players
La Liga players
K League 1 players
J1 League players
Romanian football managers
FC Sportul Studențesc București managers
Romanian expatriate footballers
Expatriate footballers in Spain
Expatriate footballers in South Korea
Expatriate footballers in Japan
Romanian expatriate sportspeople in Spain
Romanian expatriate sportspeople in South Korea
Romanian expatriate sportspeople in Japan